Peter Drury (born 24 September 1967) is a British sports commentator who currently works for NBC Sports as the lead main (play-by-play) commentator for its Premier League coverage in the United States.

Prior to joining NBC Sports, Drury was the lead main (play-by-play) commentator for Premier League Productions. 

Drury continues to freelance for Amazon Prime Video for its Premier League coverage in the United Kingdom, for BT Sport on coverage of the UEFA Europa League and UEFA Europa Conference League, for Host Broadcast Services (HBS) for the English-language world feed of the men's FIFA World Cup and for Gravity Media for the English-language world feed of the men's UEFA European Championship.

Drury freelanced for CBS Sports (US) on its English-language coverage of UEFA Champions League and the Europa League in 2020-2022.  He had also freelanced with Pitch International for the English-language world feed of the EFL Cup through 2022.

Drury was formerly with ITV Sport (UK) as its second-choice football commentator, a role he had held from 1998 to 2013.

Early life
Drury was born on 24 September 1967 in England. His father was a Church of England vicar based in Kent. The first club he supported as a four-year-old was West Ham United, but he has since gone on to support different clubs, most notably Watford as he now lives in Hertfordshire. He went to St John's School, Leatherhead in Surrey. While growing up, Drury's commentary idol was BBC Radio's Peter Jones, who Drury describes as having a "beautiful, authoritative, and poetic voice". When he was 18 and he used to see Hull City matches, he was usually the first man at Boothferry Park a couple of hours before the other spectators came flooding in. He worked as an accountant for a period of one month after graduating from university. Before joining BBC Radio Leeds, he worked for sports journalism agency Hayter's.

Commentary career

Beginnings with BBC Radio (1990–98)
In March 1990, Drury got a job with BBC Radio Leeds and he was there at a time when Leeds were champions of the Football League First Division in the 1991–92 season. His early works with Radio Leeds included matches involving Halifax Town, Bradford City and Huddersfield Town. He also commentated on both legs of Leeds United's UEFA Champions League first round tie with VfB Stuttgart in September 1992, in which after coming back from a 3–0 first-leg deficit to win 4–1, he remarked that their fans were 'proud as punch' of Howard Wilkinson's team and they were to be eliminated on away goals, but it went into a play-off which they won 2–1 on 9 October. He soon moved to Five Live following its launch on 28 March 1994. His credits include the 1996 UEFA Champions League Final (alongside future ITV colleague Jon Champion) and UEFA Euro 96, where he covered Group D matches involving Portugal and Turkey. In 1997, he also commentated on The Open Championship and the Ryder Cup with 5 Live.

Televised commentary (1997–present) 
Drury later moved on to Broadcasting House in London at the start of 1997–98 season where he got an opportunity to cover matches of the day including the third match which was Everton vs Sheffield Wednesday on Saturday 4 October 1997 at Hillsborough Stadium.

He then joined ITV in February 1998 and his first match for the network was a replay of an FA Cup sixth round tie between Sheffield United and Coventry City on 17 March. After finishing 1–1 in both the original and replay matches, the Blades came out victorious, winning 3–1 on penalties. He was immediately selected to be part of the commentary team as their junior correspondent for the 1998 FIFA World Cup in France, replacing John Helm. During his 15 years with ITV, Drury commentated on four World Cups (1998–2010) and four European Championship tournaments (2000–2012). He also commentated on the UEFA Champions League, UEFA Cup / Europa League, ITV's 'The Premiership' (coverage of the English Premier League between 2001 and 2004) and the This is Football video game series, starting with 2 (2000). Other than football, he presented The Boat Race, as well as snooker tournaments such as the short-lived Nations Cup.

Drury commentated on the 2014 FIFA World Cup final match between Germany and Argentina on 13 July 2014 at the Maracanã Stadium. In 2013, he joined BT Sport for their coverage of the Premier League, FA Cup, UEFA Champions League and UEFA Europa League. In 2015, Drury replaced Jon Champion as the primary commentator in the Pro Evolution Soccer video game series, starting with Pro Evolution Soccer 2016, having also narrated Sony's This Is Football series earlier. During the 2014 FIFA World Cup and the 2018 FIFA World Cup, he commentated on matches for FIFA's international feed and its YouTube channel, including the final between France and Croatia. Drury has covered most of the Premier League matches alongside co-commentator Jim Beglin, whom he has worked with since 1995 including his early work with 5 live. Drury insists that viewers normally tune in to watch the match and not because of both of them. He signed with SuperSport in 2019. Drury joined CBS Sports (USA) for its UEFA Champions League and UEFA Europa League coverage in August 2020, as the co-#1 play-by-play commentator (alternating with former ITV colleague Clive Tyldesley).

On 31 May 2022, following the conclusion of the 2021–22 season, Drury announced that he had left Premier League Productions, but would continue to commentate on the Premier League into next season after joining NBC Sports, replacing Arlo White (who was then signed by LIV Golf) as their lead play-by-play commentator. His position was confirmed on 6 July 2022.

Style of commentary 
Drury has been famed for his expressive and extremely literate style of commentary. He is known for his poetic style of commentary, often using phrases such as "in a trice" instead of common language.

References

British association football commentators
Living people
British sports broadcasters
British sportswriters
People educated at St John's School, Leatherhead
Darts people
1967 births
Association football commentators